The 1965 Taça de Portugal Final was the final match of the 1964–65 Taça de Portugal, the 25th season of the Taça de Portugal, the premier Portuguese football cup competition organized by the Portuguese Football Federation (FPF). The match was played on 4 July 1965 at the Estádio Nacional in Oeiras, and opposed two Primeira Liga sides: Benfica and Vitória de Setúbal. Vitória de Setúbal defeated Benfica 3–1 to claim their first Taça de Portugal.

Match

Details

References

1965
Taca
S.L. Benfica matches
Vitória F.C. matches